Big Valley may refer to:

Places 
 Big Valley, Alberta, Canada
 Big Valley, a local name for Kishacoquillas Valley in Pennsylvania

California 
 Big Valley (Pit River), an area along part of the Pit River in California
 Big Valley, former name of the Lakeport, California post office in Lake County
 Big Valley, Lassen County, California
 Big Valley City, a former name of Nubieber, California in Lassen County
 Big Valley Mountains, in Lassen County, California

Other uses 
 The Big Valley, an American western television series
 F/V Big Valley, an Alaskan fishing vessel that sank in 2005

See also